Massachusetts House of Representatives' 9th Bristol district in the United States is one of 160 legislative districts included in the lower house of the Massachusetts General Court. It covers part of Bristol County. Democrat Christopher Markey of Dartmouth has represented the district since 2011.

Locales represented
The district includes the following localities:
 Dartmouth
 In New Bedford: Ward 3, Precincts D, E, and F 

The current district geographic boundary overlaps with that of the Massachusetts Senate's 2nd Bristol and Plymouth district.

Former locale
The district previously covered part of Fall River, circa 1927.

Representatives
 Nathaniel Potter, Jr, circa 1858-1859 
 Robert Henry, circa 1888 
 John C. Milne, circa 1888 
 Robert L. Manley, circa 1920 
 Isaac U. Wood, circa 1920 
 Frank Eben Brown, circa 1951 
 Thomas C. Norton, circa 1975 
 Leonard Gonsalves
 John F. Quinn
 Christopher M. Markey, 2011-current

See also
 List of Massachusetts House of Representatives elections
 Other Bristol County districts of the Massachusetts House of Representatives: 1st, 2nd, 3rd, 4th, 5th, 6th, 7th, 8th, 10th, 11th, 12th, 13th, 14th
 List of Massachusetts General Courts
 List of former districts of the Massachusetts House of Representatives

Images

References

External links
 Ballotpedia
  (State House district information based on U.S. Census Bureau's American Community Survey).

House
Government of Bristol County, Massachusetts